The Alaska congressional election of 1970 was held on Tuesday, November 3, 1970. The term of the state's sole Representative to the United States House of Representatives expired on January 3, 1971. Incumbent Howard Wallace Pollock retired to run for Governor of Alaska. The winning candidate would serve a two-year term from January 3, 1971, to January 3, 1973. Nick Begich defeated former Alaska Commissioner of Economic Development & Anchorage banker Frank Murkowski, by a margin of 10.2%. 

Begich would go missing on October 16th 1972, posthumously win the 1972 election, be declared dead on December 29th, 1972, and be succeeded by Don Young, who won the 1973 special election. Young would hold the seat for 49 years, until his death in 2022. Murkowski would be elected U.S. Senator in the 1980 Senate election, and later become Governor for one term in the 2002 gubernatorial election.

General election

Results

References

1970
Alaska
United States House of Representatives